Sima Xun (306–366), courtesy name Weichang, was a military general and warlord of the Chinese Eastern Jin dynasty. Following the destruction of the Han Zhao dynasty in 329, Sima Xun fled south to the Eastern Jin based in Jiankang, where he grew to hold both military and provincial power. Based in Liangzhou, he participated in a series of northern expeditions in the mid-4th century but was ultimately unsuccessful. Sima Xun was cruel and ambitious, and in 365, he rebelled in hopes of claiming independence in Liangzhou. However, his rebellion was quelled by Zhu Xu in a matter of months, and he was subsequently executed by Huan Wen.

Early life 
Sima Xun was the great-great-grandson of Sima Xún (司馬恂), a brother of Sima Yi. He was nine years old and living in Chang'an in 316 when the city fell to Han Zhao forces led by Liu Yao that year. Liu Yao's general, Linghu Ni (令狐泥) discovered Sima Xun and decided to adopt him as his own son. Growing up under Linghu Ni, he learnt to ride horses and excelled in archery, so much so that he was capable of firing a bow with either one of his hands.

Han Zhao was destroyed by its rival state Later Zhao in 329. Xun was able to escape the Guanzhong region and made his way to Jiangnan. In 331, he arrived in Jiankang, where his previous family had relocated and made it their dynasty's new capital. There, he declared "I am the great-great-grandson of the Empress's Chamberlain, Xun, the great-grandson of the Champion General and King Hui of Jinan, Sui, and the son of the Grand Warden of Lueyang, Guan." His family believed him and welcomed him back, making him Supervisor of the Internuncios. Despite being a Sima, he was never given a kingly title throughout his time in Jin.

Service under the Jin dynasty

Early career 
In 336, Sima Xun was sent to Hanzhong to gather and populate the area with Jin subjects. At the time, Hanzhong was a part of Cheng Han's domain. When the Han emperor Li Qi, noticed Xun's activities, he sent his general Li Shou to attack him. Xun was routed, and after he fled, Li Shou reinforced the area by appointing new local administrators. 

By 344, Sima Xun had grown to become Yu Yi's Army Advisor. That year, the Inspector of Liangzhou, Huan Xuan passed away, so Yu Yi appointed Xun to replace him. At the time of Xun's appointment, Cheng Han held a portion of Liangzhou, so his control was only limited to Jin's half of the province. This changed in 347, when the general Huan Wen conquered Cheng and took back the remaining parts of Yizhou and Liangzhou for Jin. After this event, Sima Xun's territory and influence expanded.

Northern expeditions 
In 349, Later Zhao went through a hasty decline after the death of its emperor, Shi Hu. His successor, Shi Shi, was removed in a coup by his brother Shi Zun just a month into his reign. Shi Zun's coup riled up his brothers and a number of rebellions sprung up in Zhao. Seeing this vulnerability, Jin decided to react quickly and began holding expeditions to reclaim the north. Sima Xun saw his opening that year when the people of Yongzhou urged him to overthrow the prince, Shi Bao (石苞), who was infamously incompetent and was planning to attack Shi Zun. 

Sima Xun marched through the Luo Valley (駱谷; southwest of present-day Zhouzhi County, Shaanxi) and captured Changcheng. He camped at Xuangou (懸鈎) before sending his general Liu Huan (劉煥) to capture the ancient capital of Chang'an. While doing so, Liu Huan killed the Zhao Administrator of Jingzhao, Liu Xiuli (劉秀離) and captured Hecheng (賀城, in present-day Zhouzhi County, Shaanxi). The people around the region killed any Zhao officials they could find and welcomed the Jin forces. Faced with this crisis, Shi Bao called off his plans and sent Ma Qiu and Yao Guo (姚国) to repel Sima Xun. Shi Zun also sent Wang Lang to help Shi Bao, and Xun, feeling that the Zhao forces had him outnumbered, decided not to advance. When winter came, Xun decided to retreat.  Along the way, he captured the city of Wancheng from Zhao and killed their Administrator of Nanyang, Yuan Jing (袁景) before returning to his base in Liangzhou.

Zhao continued to deteriorate as Ran Min took over the government later in 349. In 351, Former Qin forces drove out Du Hong (杜洪) and Zhang Ju (張舉) from the Guanzhong region. The two men asked Sima Xun for assistance, so he marched back north again. Qin's ruler, Fu Jian personally met his forces at Wuzhang Plains and repeatedly defeated him. Sima Xun eventually forfeited and retreated to Nanzheng. 

Meanwhile, Du Hong and Zhang Ju were falling out with each other. Du considered his family superior to Zhang's and constantly berated him. Angered, Zhang ordered his men to injure Du. Du knew how much Xun was worried of Zhang's power, and so managed to persuade him to kill Zhang. In 352, Sima Xun pretended to invite Zhang Ju over to meet him but instead had him arrested and executed. Zhang Ju's brother (whose name was not recorded) attacked Sima Xun, but the two agreed to a truce and Sima Xun returned south. Du declared himself King of Qin, but he was killed by Fu Jian's forces not long after.

Xiao Jingwen's rebellion 
Back in 347, a Jin general by the name of Xiao Jingwen (蕭敬文) had rebelled in Fucheng and declared himself King of Chengdu, stirring trouble in Baxi (巴西; around present-day Langzhong, Sichuan) and Hanzhong. The Inspector of Yizhou, Zhou Fu (周撫) campaigned against him for the next five years but could not capture his capital. In late 352, Huan Wen sent Sima Xun to help Zhou Fu, and the two generals finally managed to kill Xiao Jingwen and put down his rebellion.

Huan Wen's 1st northern expedition 
In 356, Huan Wen launched his first northern expedition in collaboration with Sima Xun and Former Liang. Sima Xun harassed Qin through the Ziwu Valley (子午谷; east of present-day Yang County, Shaanxi) while Liang's general, Wang Zhuo captured the city of Chencang . Huan Wen defeated the Qin forces at the Battle of Bailu Plains, so the Qin commander Fu Xiong shifted his focus to retaking the western regions. Fu Xiong routed Sima Xun, causing him to retreat to Fort Nüwa (女媧堡). Fu Xiong then returned to Bailu Plains, where this time he defeated Huan Wen and forced him to turn back. Sima Xun faced Fu Xiong again at Chencang together with Wang Zhuo, but they too were defeated. Xun retreated to Hanzhong while Wang fled to Lueyang, officially ending the expedition in failure.

Rebellion and death 
For the next decade, Sima Xun remained in Liangzhou, seeing little to no action at all. He was cruel in administrating his province and was prone to killing his critics regardless of their positions. Sometimes, he would personally carry out their executions, using a bow and arrow to kill them. More worrying to some was that he had ambitions to break away from the state. Huan Wen knew of this and tried to appease Xun by making his son, Sima Kang (司馬康), the Administrator of Hanzhong. However, this was not enough to dissuade Xun. 

Sima Xun was fearful of the Inspector of Yizhou, Zhou Fu, when he was alive, but after Zhou died in 365, Xun began planning his rebellion. His officers, Yong Duan (雍端) and Kui Cui (隗粹) were against this but Sima Xun had them both killed. In December of 365, he declared himself Governor of Liangzhou and Yizhou and the King of Chengdu before attacking Fucheng. The city was abandoned by Guanqiu Wei (毌丘暐), so Sima Xun swiftly captured it before marching on to Chengdu and besieging the new Inspector of Yizhou, Zhou Chu (周楚). 

Huan Wen responded by sending his general, Zhu Xu to lift the siege. His brother, Huan Huo, also sent his general Huan Pi (桓羆) to attack Nanzheng to help in the campaign against Sima Xun. In the middle of 366, Zhu Xu arrived at Chengdu, where he and Zhou Fu jointly attacked Sima Xun's army. Sima Xun's soldiers scattered, and soon after Xun and his officials were all captured by Zhu. Zhu Xu handed them over to Huan Wen, who had them beheaded and sent their heads to Jiankang.

Note

References 

 Fang, Xuanling (ed.) (648). Book of Jin (Jin Shu).
 Sima, Guang (1084). Zizhi Tongjian.

365 deaths
Jin dynasty (266–420) generals
Executed Jin dynasty (266–420) people
Former Zhao people